Noëlle Norman (January 7, 1921 – January 11, 1985) was a French film actress. She appeared in more than thirty films including On demande un assassin (1949).

Selected filmography
 Immediate Call (1939)
 It Always Ends That Way (1939)
 Then We'll Get a Divorce (1940)
 The Blue Veil (1942)
 Mademoiselle Béatrice (1943)
 The Misfortunes of Sophie (1946)
 Emile the African (1949)
 The Paris Waltz (1950)
 Come Down, Someone Wants You (1951)
 Love Is Just a Fairytale (1955)
 Eighteen Hour Stopover (1955)

References

Bibliography 
 Goble, Alan. The Complete Index to Literary Sources in Film. Walter de Gruyter, 1999.

External links 
 

1921 births
French film actresses
Actresses from Paris
20th-century French actresses
1985 suicides
Drug-related suicides in France
Barbiturates-related deaths